Grin is a 1971 album by Grin, featuring songs by their guitarist Nils Lofgren. As well as being an album in its own right, this was released by CBS in the UK as part of a 1976 double album set along with its successor 1+1. In 2005, it was issued on CD in remastered form, with the addition of two more tracks from the original sessions. The album was dedicated to Roy Buchanan with "special thanks" to Neil Young and Crazy Horse.

Track listing 
All tracks composed by Nils Lofgren
  "Like Rain" - 3:38
  "See What a Love Can Do" - 5:02 (*) (Jerry Williams - scat vocals)
  "Everybody's Missin' the Sun" - 2:44
  "18 Faced Lover" - 3:26
  "Outlaw" - 4:02 (*)
  "We All Sung Together" - 3:44
  "If I Were a Song" - 3:10
  "Take You to the Movies Tonight" - 1:45
  "Direction" - 4:14
  "Pioneer Mary"  - 3:45 (*)
  "Open Wide" - 3:02
  "I Had Too Much (Miss Dazi)" - 3:23

2005 Sony CD bonus tracks 

  "Nobody" - 2:57
  "Sing for Happiness" - 3:15 (**)

All songs written by Nils Lofgren. Timings taken from remastered CD.

"Nobody" features the original lyrics prior to being re-written for Crazy Horse. Both "Nobody" and "Sing for Happiness" were previously released on The Very Best of Grin, Spindizzy/Epic Associated/Legacy 65697-SI.

Cover versions
The live track labelled "Any Day Woman" recorded by Plainsong includes a version of "Take You to the Movies Tonight" after that Paul Siebel song.

Personnel
Grin
 Nils Lofgren - Guitars, Keyboards, Vocals
 Bob Berberich - Drums, Vocals
 Bob Gordon - Bass, Vocals
with:
    (*)  Harmony vocals by Danny Whitten, Neil Young and Ralph Molina.
    (*)  Scat singing by Jerry Williams
  (**) Ben Keith on steel guitar
Technical
Bruce McCauley - cover artwork

References
All information from album & CD cover and label.

1971 debut albums
Nils Lofgren albums
Albums produced by David Briggs (producer)
Epic Records albums
Albums recorded at Wally Heider Studios